Louis Vandenbergh (born 26 November 1903, date of death unknown) was a Belgian footballer. He played in eleven matches for the Belgium national football team from 1928 to 1933.

References

External links
 

1903 births
Year of death missing
Belgian footballers
Belgium international footballers
Place of birth missing
Association football goalkeepers